Alcapurria is a popular fritter dish from Puerto Rico.

Origin
It may have influence from Middle Eastern kibbeh as there is a significant amount of Lebanese and Armenian in San Juan.

Preparation 

The dough surrounding the filling, the masa, is made primarily of green banana and grated xanthosoma ("yautía") in most of Puerto Rico with optional addition of squash. Green banana can be replaced with breadfruit, cassava, taro, green or yellow plantains or other arrowroots. Alcapurrias are generally seasoned with lard, annatto, garlic and salt. The annatto gives it signature yellow/orange color. Annatto seeds are simmered in lard to release most of its color and flavor. Seeds are discarded and the tinted lard is then poured over the masa.

The masa is refrigerated for several hours to achieve a solid consistency. Diced potatoes cooked with picadillo or corned beef are the most typical fillings; others include longaniza, blood sausage, braised meat, cheese, seafood and vegetables.  They can be deep-fried in lard or oil, or baked (alcapurrias horneadas). When cooked, the fritter is "hot and brittle". Alcapurrias are served at kiosks and at fine restaurants, as well.

Other
During the COVID-19 pandemic in Puerto Rico and the lockdowns that went along with it, small restaurants around the island found ways to deliver hot alcapurrias to people's homes.

See also 
 Bacalaíto
 Empanadilla

References

External links
 Alcapurria recipe
 Alcapurria recipe 2

Puerto Rican cuisine
Banana dishes